Ferdinand Ernst Felle (26 April 1876 in Biberach an der Riss – 23 April 1959 in Heidelberg) was a German rower who competed in the 1900 Summer Olympics. He was part of the German boat Ludwigshafener Ruderverein, which won the bronze medal in the coxed four final B.

References

External links

Ernst Felle's profile at Sports Reference.com

1876 births
1959 deaths
Olympic rowers of Germany
Rowers at the 1900 Summer Olympics
Olympic bronze medalists for Germany
Olympic medalists in rowing
German male rowers
Medalists at the 1900 Summer Olympics
People from Biberach an der Riss
Sportspeople from Baden-Württemberg